Steroidobacter denitrificans is a Gram-negative and motile bacterium from the genus of Steroidobacter which has been isolated from anoxic sewage sludge from Soers in Germany.
Steroidobacter denitrificans has the ability to degrade steroid hormones.

References

Bacteria described in 2008
Gammaproteobacteria